Turnerville (also Tallula) is an unincorporated community in Habersham County, Georgia, United States. Its ZIP code is 30580.

History
Turnerville was originally called "Tallula", and under the latter name a post office opened in 1858.

Notable person
Georgia state senator Nancy Schaefer lived near Turnerville.

Notes

Unincorporated communities in Habersham County, Georgia
Unincorporated communities in Georgia (U.S. state)